Society Lady is a 1978 Indian Malayalam-language film, directed by A. B. Raj and produced by Areefa Enterprises. The film stars Madhu, Sharada, Kaviyoor Ponnamma and Thikkurissy Sukumaran Nair. The film has musical score by K. J. Joy.

Cast
Madhu 
Sharada 
Kaviyoor Ponnamma 
Thikkurissy Sukumaran Nair 
Bahadoor 
K. P. Ummer 
Vidhubala 
Vijayalalitha
Vincent

Soundtrack
The music was composed by K. J. Joy and the lyrics were written by Mankombu Gopalakrishnan.

References

External links
 

1978 films
1970s Malayalam-language films